Luis Ignacio Ingolotti (born 14 January 2000) is an Argentine professional footballer who plays as a goalkeeper for Aldosivi.

Club career
Ingolotti started with Sportivo Pilar, before having stints with Vélez Sarsfield and Platense. In 2015, Ingolotti joined Aldosivi. He made the first-team's substitute's bench in November 2017 for a Primera B Nacional draw away to Guillermo Brown; in a campaign that ended with promotion to the top-flight. He was an unused sub a further eight times across the next three years. Ingolotti's senior debut came on 14 January 2021, his 21st birthday, as he played the full duration of a 4–4 draw away to Defensa y Justicia in the Copa de la Liga Profesional; goalkeepers ahead of him, Luciano Pocrnjic and Fabián Assmann, were unavailable.

International career
Ingolotti received call-ups from Argentina at U17 and U20 level; for the latter, he was selected in Fernando Batista's preliminary squad for the 2020 CONMEBOL Pre-Olympic Tournament in Colombia, though didn't make the final cut.

Style of play
Up until the age of seven or eight, Ingolotti played as a forward. One day, with a goalkeeper missing for a match, Ingolotti was selected to go in goal by virtue of being the tallest player - he would remain in that position.

Personal life
On 2 January 2021, it was confirmed that Ingolotti had tested asymptomatically positive for COVID-19; amid the global pandemic.

Career statistics
.

Notes

References

External links

2000 births
Living people
Argentine people of Italian descent
Sportspeople from Buenos Aires Province
Argentine footballers
Association football goalkeepers
Argentine Primera División players
Aldosivi footballers